Chris Winter (born 2 November 1989) is an Australian television presenter, YouTube personality and entrepreneur.

Career

2008–2014: Television

Winter started his television career at the age of 20, working as an intern news reporter at Channel Nine News. Under the guidance of more experienced journalists, including anchorwoman Eva Milic, Winter continued to learn the trade before successfully auditioning to be a guest host for the Australian wide music television series Hit List TV, which is broadcast on Network Ten and, in country areas, Southern Cross Ten.

2014–present: Move to YouTube

Winter started his YouTube channel in 2014, primarily teaching his photography and cinematography knowledge that he learnt during his television career. As of December 2020, Winter has over 500,000 subscribers on YouTube and has had over 55 million views.

References 

1989 births
Living people
Australian television presenters
Australian television journalists
People educated at Pembroke School, Adelaide
People from Adelaide
People from the Gold Coast, Queensland